Hell Hath No Fury was the second studio album by British heavy metal band, Rock Goddess. All songs were again written and composed by Jody Turner. The American version was published with different cover artwork and 2 different songs, taken from the "I Didn't Know I Loved You (Till I Saw You Rock 'n' Roll)" single, instead of songs 2 and 7 of the European edition.

Track listings 
Original UK Vinyl Release

American release

Notes
 The American 1994 CD print Reissue features a different tracklist order as well as new tracks "Hell Hath No Fury" and the Gary Glitter cover "I Didn't Know I Loved You (Till I Saw You Rock and Roll)," which replace "No More", and "I've Seen It All Before."
 The 2008 Reissue includes the UK vinyl exclusives "No More", and "I've Seen It All Before." It also includes new remixes of the tracks "Satisfied Then Crucified" and "My Angel."

Personnel
Rock Goddess
Jody Turner – lead & rhythm guitar, lead vocals
Julie Turner – drums, backing vocals
Dee O'Malley – bass, keyboards, backing vocals

Production
Chris Tsangarides – producer, engineer
Andrew Warwick, Pete Brown, Vicky Harris – assistant engineers
Ian Cooper – mastering at The Townhouse, London
Fin Costello – photography

References

External links 
 Rock Goddess at Metal Maidens.com

Rock Goddess albums
1984 albums
Albums produced by Chris Tsangarides
A&M Records albums